John Swaab (28 October 1928 – 4 December 2016) was a Dutch equestrian. He competed in two events at the 1972 Summer Olympics.

References

1928 births
2016 deaths
Dutch male equestrians
Dutch dressage riders
Olympic equestrians of the Netherlands
Equestrians at the 1972 Summer Olympics
Sportspeople from Amsterdam